Frederic D. Meyer (September 29, 1919 – July 10, 1996) was an American football end who played in the National Football League (NFL) for the Philadelphia Eagles in 1942 and 1945. After playing college football for Stanford, he was drafted by the Eagles in the 12th round (103rd overall) of the 1942 NFL Draft. During the 1942 season, he ranked among the NFL's leaders with 324 receiving yards (sixth) and 32.4 receiving yards per game (fifth). He served in World War II for the United States Navy before rejoining the Eagles in 1945.

References

1919 births
1996 deaths
People from Mount Sterling, Illinois
Players of American football from Illinois
American football ends
Stanford Cardinal football players
Philadelphia Eagles players
United States Navy personnel of World War II